The Carnutes or Carnuti (Gaulish: 'the horned ones'), were a Gallic tribe dwelling in an extensive territory between the Sequana (Seine) and the Liger (Loire) rivers during the Iron Age and the Roman period.

Name 
They are mentioned as Carnutes by Caesar (mid-1st c. BC) and Livy (late-1st c. BC), Carnūti by Tibullus (late-1st c. BC), Karnoútōn (Καρνούτων) and Karnoúntōn (Καρνούντων) by Strabo (early 1st c. AD), Karnoũtai (Καρνοῦται) by Ptolemy (2nd c. AD), and as Carnunta in the Notitia Dignitatum (5th c. AD).

The Gaulish ethnonym Carnutes literally means 'the horned ones', probably in reference to their combat helmets. It stems from the Gaulish root carno- ('horn'), itself from Proto-Celtic *karno- ('horn, hoof'; cf. Middle Welsh carn 'hoof'). The name Carnutes is linguistically related to the Brittonic *Kornouii and the Welsh Kernyw, designating the Cornwall region.

The city of Chartres, attested ca. 400 as Carnotum (Carnotis ca. 650, Cartis in 930), is named after the Gallic tribe.

Geography 
Their lands were later organized as the Catholic dioceses of Chartres, Orléans and Blois, that is, the greater part of the modern departments of Eure-et-Loir, Loiret and Loir-et-Cher. The territory of the Carnutes had the reputation among Roman observers of being the political and religious center of the Gaulish nations. The chief fortified towns were Cenabum (mistakenly labeled "Genabum"), the modern Orléans, where a bridge crossed the Loire, and Autricum (or Carnutes, thus Chartres). The great annual druidic assembly mentioned by Caesar took place in one or the other of these towns. Livy's history records the legendary tradition that the Carnutes had been one of the tribes that accompanied Bellovesus in his invasion of Italy during the reign of Tarquinius Priscus.

History 

In the 1st century BC, the Carnutes minted coins, usually struck with dies, but sometimes cast in an alloy of high tin content called potin. Their coinage turns up in hoards well outside their home territories, in some cases so widely distributed in the finds that the place of coinage is not secure. The iconography of their numismatics includes the motifs of heads with traditional Celtic torcs; a wolf with a star; a galloping horse; and the triskelion. Many coins show an eagle with the lunar crescent, with a serpent, or with a wheel with six or four spokes, or a pentagrammatic star, or beneath a hand holding a branch with berries, holly perhaps. The wheel with four spokes forms a cross within a circle, an almost universal image since Neolithic times. Sometimes the circle is a ring of granules. Among the Celts, the ring and spokes may represent the cycle of the year divided in its four seasons, rather than the sun, which is a common meaning among cultures. See Cross.

In the time of Caesar, the Carnutes were dependents of the Remi, who on one occasion interceded for them. In the winter of 58–57 BC, Caesar imposed a protectorate over the Carnutes and set up Tasgetius as his choice of king, picked from the ruling clan. Within three years, the Carnutes assassinated the puppet king.  On 13 February 53 BC, the Carnutes of Cenabum massacred all the Roman merchants stationed in the town as well as one of Caesar's commissariat officers. The uprising became a general one throughout Gaul, under the leadership of Vercingetorix. Caesar burned Cenabum, where he had the men killed and women and children sold as slaves. The booty was distributed among his soldiers, an effective way of financing the conquest of Gaul. During the war that followed, the Carnutes sent 12,000 fighting men to relieve Alesia, but shared in the defeat of the Gallic army. Having attacked the Bituriges, who appealed to Caesar for assistance, they were forced to submit. Cenabum was left for years as a mass of ruins for example, with two Roman legions garrisoned there.

After they had been pacified, though not Romanized, under Augustus, the Carnutes, as one of the peoples of Gallia Lugdunensis, were raised to the rank of civitas socia or foederati. They retained their self-governing institutions, and minted coins; their only obligation was for the men to render military service to the emperor. Up to the 3rd century, Autricum (later Carnutes, whence Chartres) was the capital. In 275 Aurelian refounded Cenabum, ordaining it no longer a vicus but a civitas; he named it Aurelianum or Aurelianensis urbs (which eventually became Orléans).

References

Bibliography

External links

Monnayage des Carnutes: detailed illustrations of numismatics
Coins minted by the Carnutes, 1st century BCE
Histoire de la ville d'Orléans": map of the Carnutes territory (in French)
R. Boutrays, Urbis gentisque Carnutum historia 1624
A. Desjardins, Géographie historique de la Gaule, ii, I876 1893

 
Historical Celtic peoples
Gauls
Tribes of pre-Roman Gaul
Tribes involved in the Gallic Wars
History of Eure-et-Loir
History of Loir-et-Cher
History of Orléans
Chartres